1st Battalion, 3rd Marines (1/3) is an infantry battalion in the United States Marine Corps based out of Marine Corps Base Hawaii. Nicknamed the "Lava Dogs", the battalion consists of approximately 800 Marines and sailors and falls under the command of the 3rd Marine Regiment of the 3rd Marine Division.

Subordinate units
 Headquarters and Service Company
 Alpha Company
 Bravo Company
 Charlie Company

History

World War II

On May 1, 1942, the 1st Training Battalion was activated at Marine Corps Air Station New River, North Carolina. A month and a half later, on June 17, the unit was redesignated as the 1st Battalion, 3rd Marine Regiment. The battalion received its first combat experience in November 1943 against the Japanese in the Battle of Bougainville. The battalion fought with distinction for nearly two months against stiff resistance in difficult terrain before being sent to Guadalcanal to prepare for the next stage of the Pacific Theatre.

The Battle of Guam was the next combat assignment for 1st Battalion, 3d Marines. The amphibious assault on Guam began on July 21, 1944, with the battalion landing near Asan Point in western Guam. Once again, the battalion encountered fierce opposition and the fighting proved to be costly. Organized Japanese resistance officially ended on August 10 and Guam was declared “secured”. However, numerous Japanese remained operational in the jungle and refused to surrender. Subsequently, the battalion participated in “mopping-up” operations until it departed for Iwo Jima in February 1945.

In early 1945, 1st Battalion, 3d Marines, as part of Regimental Combat Team 3, was to be the floating reserve for the amphibious assault of the Battle of Iwo Jima. However, the battalion was never called upon to land or to take part in the battle. Instead it returned to Guam in March where it continued to remove the small pockets of Japanese resistance that still remained on the island.

The battalion remained on Guam through the surrender of the Japanese in September 1945. Although the end of the war signified the end of hostilities, there was still much work to be done. The Islands in the Pacific held by the Japanese had to be demilitarized and the Japanese forces repatriated to mainland Japan, this job fell to 1st Battalion, 3d Marines, soon to be known as the “Chichi Jima” Marines. Chichi Jima was an Island fortress, often referred to as the Gibraltar of the Pacific, located in the Ogasawara Island chain 615 miles south of Tokyo. After 14 years of war in China and the Pacific, Japan had arrived at a mortifying surrender. At exactly 1015 on December 13, 1945, the Japanese flag flying over Chici Jima was lowered from its staff. The Japanese Color Guard folded the flag and presented it to the Commanding Officer of 1st Battalion, 3d Marines. At 1025, the Marine Drum and Bugle Corps sounded Colors and everyone present, American and Japanese alike, rendered a salute as Old Glory was raised to her lofty summit. With the Japanese threat removed from Chichi Jima, 1st Battalion, 3d Marines returned to Guam where it was deactivated on February 9, 1946.

Vietnam War

1st Battalion, 3d Marines became the second American infantry unit to enter South Vietnam. The battalion began its movement, via air, to Da Nang Air Base in early March 1965 and completed its movement by mid-March. Less than six months after its arrival, 1/3 was withdrawn to Okinawa. The battalion was sent back to Vietnam on November 18, 1965. The 1968 Tet Offensive ushered in a new wave of intense combat activity for the Marines and in May, 1/3 found itself heavily engaged in fighting North Vietnamese units at the village of Dai Do near the Cua Viet River.

In 1969. the United States began to slowly withdraw combat units from Southeast Asia. One of the first Marine units to be notified to commence stand down operations was 1st Battalion, 3d Marines. The unit departed South Vietnam for the United States on October 5, 1969. Towards the end of the month the battalion arrived in California and was located at again at Camp Pendleton. Shortly thereafter, it was reduced to zero strength, effective November 18, 1969. It then was reestablished at Kaneohe Bay, Hawaii as part of the 1st Marine Brigade on November 27, 1969.

1980s

Throughout the 1980s, 1/3 regularly deployed to Okinawa to serve as a forward staged unit in the Western Pacific area as part of the Marine Corps Unit Deployment Program. During the Unit Deployment Program, the battalion would regularly participate in exercises throughout the region, such as in Korea and Thailand. In December 1989, while at Okinawa, 1/3 responded to the 1989 Philippine coup attempt as part of an amphibious task force and sent Marines ashore to reinforce the American Embassy. The battalion formed the ground combat element of CTF-79 (Commander, Landing Force, Seventh Fleet). Bravo Company, 2nd Platoon flew in by helicopter onto the grounds of the American Embassy and afterwards drove through Manila en route to a nearby compound to guard and protect American civilians living in the compound.

The Gulf War and the 1990s

In August 1990, 1st Battalion, 3d Marines deployed to Saudi Arabia for Operation Desert Shield and took up defensive positions along the coastal highway leading to Kuwait. In February 1991, 1/3 assaulted into Kuwait as part of the ground war of Operation Desert Storm to liberate the country from Iraqi occupation. In April 1991, the battalion redeployed to their home station in Hawaii.

The Global War on Terrorism
1/3 was on the Unit Deployment Program (UDP) to Okinawa, Japan during the Al Qaeda terrorist attacks of September 11, 2001. Due to their proximity to Afghanistan, the battalion's Company A was one of the first infantry units to deploy to U.S. Central Command, of which Afghanistan is a part, after the September 11 attacks. The company was attached to the Fifth Fleet, based out of NSA Bahrain and subsequently deployed in direct support of Combined Task Force 53 (CTF 53) for the initial phase of Operation Enduring Freedom.

In October 2002, an Army Special Forces Sergeant First Class (SFC) was killed in the Southern Philippines by an IED. Shortly after, Charlie company along with Alpha Company's Weapons Platoon, deployed to Camp Cobra in Zamboanga, Philippines as the Marine Security Element for JTF-555/JSOTF-P in support of Operation Enduring Freedom Philippines.

April 2003, 1/3 departed Kaneohe for another UDP in Okinawa, Japan. Alpha company, with Weapons company reinforcements left for the Philippines as the MSE under the guise of JTF-510. Alpha company carried out many joint missions with Navy SEAL/s, SWCC, and the CIA in terrorist surveillance activities, and security missions in Zamboanga Bay. Also, despite the constant threat of attack from the Abu Sayf, and the MILF (Moro Islamic Liberation Front), Alpha carried out security for many Engineering Civic Action Programs (ENCAPs) by building schools and repairing hospitals deep in the jungle. Alpha Company Navy Hospital Corpsman also carried out two major MEDCAPs seeing a total of 17,000 patients.

In June 2004, 1/3 (also known at the time as BLT 1/3, and including Battery C 1st Battalion 12th Marines - also from MCBH) set off to tour what was known as a standard deployment around the South Pacific region with the 31st Marine Expeditionary Unit (MEU). In early September  2004, the unit arrived in Kuwait and soon after entered Iraq. The unit fought in the Second Battle of Fallujah as part of Regimental Combat Team 7 to clear the city of insurgents and reclaim the city. In one deployment, BLT 1/3 unfortunately lost more men compared to any Marine Corps Battalion during OIF/OEF. BLT 1/3 has produced one of very few nominations for the Medal of Honor thus far in the Global War on Terror, Sergeant Rafael Peralta. After insurgents threw a grenade into a room with several Marines, Sergeant Peralta used his body as a shield to protect his 'brothers-in-arms' from the blast.

On January 26, 2005, a CH-53E Super Stallion helicopter crashed in the Al-Anbar province taking with it the lives of 26 Kaneohe Bay Marines, along with one Navy Corpsman and four Marine aircrew from a mainland unit. The majority of the 27 Marines lost in the crash were from Charlie Company of Battalion Landing Team 1/3. Battalion Landing Team 1/3 lost a total of 45 Marines during the course of their first combat tour in Iraq.

In January 2006, the battalion deployed to eastern Afghanistan in support of Operation Enduring Freedom. During this five-month deployment they operated throughout the Korangal Valley and were known as "Task Force Lava." On June 1, 2006, 1/3 handed over their area of operations to the 1st Battalion, 32nd Infantry Regiment and shortly thereafter returned to Hawaii.

In March 2007, 1st Battalion 3d Marines deployed to Haditha, Iraq. 1/3 lost no Marines during this deployment, which was a first for the Marine Corps since the start of OIF.

The Battalion deployed to Karma, Iraq from August 2008 - March 2009.  One Marine was killed and five were injured on December 21, 2008.  

The Battalion again deployed to Afghanistan in November 2009 through June 2010, taking up positions in and around FOB Geronimo, within the district of Nawa-I-Barakzayi, Helmand Province. In February 2010, the battalion participated in Operation Moshtarak, the seizure of the Taliban stronghold of Marjah.
The activities of Bravo and Charlie Companies were covered extensively in a series of articles by C. J. Chivers in The New York Times, and in the "At War Blog" posted on The New York Times website.  A total of five Marines were KIA, along with one British reporter this deployment. 

The Battalion deployed once more to Afghanistan in April 2011, taking up positions south of FOB Delhi, in Garmsir District, Helmand Province.

Awards

  Presidential Unit Citation w/ 3 bronze stars
 Guam - 1944
 Vietnam - 1965 - 1967, 1967
 Afghanistan - 2010
  Navy Unit Commendation w/ 1 bronze star & w/ 1 silver star
 Bougainville - 1943
 Vietnam - 1965, 1968–1969
 Southwest Asia - 1990 - 1991
 Southwest Asia / OEF I - 2001 - 2002
 III MEF - 2003 - 2005
 OEF Afghanistan - 2006
 OIF Iraq I MEF - 2007-2008
 OIF Iraq II MEF - 2008
  Meritorious Unit Commendation w/ 2 bronze stars
 Vietnam - 1967 - 1968, 1968
 Southwest Asia / OEF I - 2001-2002
 III MEF- 2008-2010
  Asiatic-Pacific Campaign Medal w/ 4 bronze stars
  World War II Victory Medal
  Navy Occupation Service Medal
  National Defense Service Medal w/ 3 bronze stars
  Korean Service Medal
  Armed Forces Expeditionary Medal
  Vietnam Service Medal w/ 2 silver stars
  Southwest Asia Service Medal w/ 2 bronze stars
  Vietnam Cross of Gallantry w/ palm streamer
  Iraq Campaign Medal w/3 bronze stars
  Afghanistan Campaign Medal w/5 bronze stars
  Global War on Terrorism Service Medal
  Global War on Terrorism Expeditionary Medal

See also

List of United States Marine Corps battalions
Organization of the United States Marine Corps

Notable members
William R. Higgins, platoon commander in C Company during the Vietnam War
Jan C. Huly
Rafael Peralta, Iraqi Freedom
Wayne Rollings, platoon commander

Notes

External links

1st Battalion 3rd Marines
Facebook Lava Dogs USMC
1/3's official website

Infantry battalions of the United States Marine Corps